Patan Academy of Health Sciences (PAHS) (पाटन स्वास्थ्य विज्ञान प्रतिष्ठान) is an autonomous, not-for-profit, public institution  of higher education established in 2064 B.S. (2008 A.D.) with the charter granted by the Parliament of Nepal. 
The stated aim of the PAHS is to work in close partnership with the national health system to improve the health care services in the remote/rural areas primarily through producing technically competent and socially responsible health care workers. Currently PAHS has been running School of Medicine and School of Nursing and aims to run School of Public Health in near future. PAHS MBBS curriculum focuses on holistic care of individual and community.  PAHS preferentially enrolls students from rural areas and trains them in curriculum that emphasizes on community health and is subsequently provides support for its graduates who work in the rural areas.

History
PAHS was established in 2064 B.S. (2008 A.D.) with the charter granted by the Parliament of Nepal.  
by an Act.
PAHS has its own constitution passed by the parliament of Nepal, under the name Patan Academy of Health Sciences Act, 2008.

Academics
PAHS has MBBS course duration of 6 years unlike rest of the universities in Nepal. 
PAHS also has international tie up for the clinical placement such as The University of Sydney. It has also started its own School of Nursing, which runs nursing programs of all levels including PCL, BN, BSc Nursing and Masters in Nursing. It also run its own School of Public Health, and post graduate course in clinical sciences.

Curriculum Design
PAHS is implementing a highly progressive curriculum, modeled after modern curricula used by a growing number of Western medical schools. The curriculum at PAHS focuses on community health, the values of service and altruism, and the health of the entire population, to enhance students’ sensitivity to the health care needs of the rural poor.

Locations for Clinical Training
To supplement the core training in Patan Hospital, PAHS students are assigned to clinical postings at rural hospitals and health care centers throughout the diverse ethnic landscape of Nepal, with an emphasis on regions with disadvantaged populations. Students begin these rotations in their first year at PAHS and continue them throughout their medical education. Students’ experiences at these community postings will reinforce the principles of social responsibility and compassion that the PAHS curriculum is designed to instill in them. At the remote postings, students live with local villagers and learn to overcome the apprehensions associated with working with limited resources in unfamiliar cultures.

The hospitals and health care centers where students complete these rotations are carefully chosen to ensure that students have positive learning experiences. PAHS faculty and staff give the students careful guidance and moral support, in addition to providing them with practical knowledge.

References

External links
Official Website
Patan Academy of Health Sciences in Mero Campus
University of Gothenburg Newsletter
PAHS

Educational institutions established in 2008
Universities and colleges in Nepal
Education in Kathmandu
2008 establishments in Nepal